Erben may refer to:

People
 Henry Erben (1832–1909), American admiral, son of organbuilder Henry Erben (1800–1884)
 Karel Jaromír Erben (1811–1870), Czech historian and writer 
 Rudi Erben (fl. 1950s), West German bobsledder 
 Valentin Erben (born 1945), Austrian cellist
 Erben Wennemars (born 1975), Dutch speed skater

Other uses
 USS Erben (DD-631), American destroyer
 40106 Erben, a minor planet
 Franz Wilhelm Langguth Erben, a German winery that uses Erben as a brand name

See also
 Carl Geyling's Erben, a traditional Austrian stained glassmaker